Cross-country skiing at the 2007 Asian Winter Games was held at the Beida Lake Skiing Resort in Changchun, China from 30 January to 3 February 2007.

Schedule

Medalists

Men

Women

Medal table

Participating nations
A total of 57 athletes from 9 nations competed in cross-country skiing at the 2007 Asian Winter Games:

References
Results FIS

External links
2007 Winter Asiad sports schedule

 
2007 Asian Winter Games events
2007
Asian Winter Games